The International Film Festival for Children and Youth, formerly International Festival of Film for Children and Young Adults, is an Iranian film festival targeting children and youth. Professional filmmakers with expertise in children's films are eligible to attend the festival.

Categories 
The event is held in nine categories.

(1)  The International Cinema Competition

a.     Features

b.     Animated features

c.     Animated short films

d.     Short films

(2)  Iranian Cinema Competition

a.     Features

b.     Short films

c.     Animated short film

d.     Animated features

(3)  Script Competition

(4)  Children and Young Adult Jury Award

(5) International Center of Film for Children and Young People (CIFEJ) Award - to be judged by an international jury introduced by CIFEJ 

(6)  Tributes

(7)  Special screening

(8) Workshops

(9)  Meetings

Awards
The highest award is called the Golden Butterfly.

Host cities 

Isfahan has been the major host the International Film Festival for Children and Youth (IFFCY) for 18 rounds. Tehran, Hamedan, and Kerman have also hosted the event in previous editions.

City of Isfahan will host the festival for four coming years until 2021.

Dates 
The festival is held in different dates every year. The 30th edition is to be held on June 30 to July 6.

President of the Festival 
The vice minister and head of Iran Organization of Cinema appointed Alireza Rezadad as the director of the 30th International Festival of Film for Children and Young Adults.

External links
 Official website of the festival
 The official website of the 30th edition of the festival

References 

Film festivals in Iran
Iranian awards